The Swiss Cetacean Society is a Swiss nonprofit organization devoted to the preservation of marine mammals in their natural habitat.
Founded in 1997, its headquarters are in Lausanne in Switzerland.

History

The SCS is an organization created in 1997 by Max-Olivier Bourcoud under the name of Swiss Association for the Protection of Marine Mammals (ASMS in French). Then, in 2001, the ASMS became the Swiss Cetacean Society (SCS). Its logo is a whale tale with the initials SCS shown above. The group's goal is the conservation of marine mammals. It holds the conviction that "better scientific knowledge of the animals and their environment is essential to ensure efficient protection measures". With this aim in mind, the SCS distributes general information about marine mammals, encourages access to specialized training, organizes awareness camps and plans the logistics at sea of scientific and environmental programs abroad.

Organization

The SCS is a non-profit and independent organization with the aim of promoting awareness of marine mammals in order to encourage their protection. It relies on the contributions of its members and donations. In 2013, the society has more than  members. It has become one of the leading providers of cetacean data in the north-western Mediterranean Sea. Furthermore, it is a recognized partner of certain Mediterranean environmental institutions ACCOBAMS, RAMOGE) and the Earth Champions Foundation.

Objective

The SCS's aim is to promote knowledge of marine mammals in order to encourage their protection. To achieve this goal, it mainly uses five techniques:
 Support for scientific research, mainly logistics at sea for scientific study of cetaceans.
 Outreach and spreading of scientific information
 Access to specialized training
 Awareness of the marine ecology
 Scientific expeditions at sea.

Activities

Abroad

Scientific expeditions at sea
The Swiss Cetacean Society organizes worldwide campaigns at sea for data collection on cetacean populations. These scientific programs are co-financed by the Swiss public. The collected data is then transmitted to corporate scientists who ensure its manipulation and analysis. This SCS activity mobilizes research platforms and teams of volunteers supervised by trained naturalists.
Three scientific expeditions are conducted at sea annually with the cooperation of eco-volunteers. These are the "Mediterranean", "Bahamas" and "Azores" programs.

Mediterranean program

This is an inventory and research program on whales and dolphins in the Mediterranean Sea between Corsica and the French Riviera taking place from late June to early September. During this period, the waters culminate in food biomass attracting several whale and dolphin species in search of food, among which includes a thousand whales and tens of thousands of dolphins.

Concretely, the purpose of these scientific programs is to study whale and dolphin populations that frequent the Ligurian Sea and the Balearic Islands in summer to improve their protection.

Since 1997, SCS has carried out over  days of data collection in the Mediterranean Sea, helped to identify and observe tens of thousands of cetaceans belonging to 8 species and provided offshore work for the benefit of the International Commission for the Scientific Exploration of the Mediterranean Sea (CIESM).

In 2011, SCS began collaboration with the Ministry of Environment and Rural and Marine Affairs (MARM) to study the species distribution of cetaceans in the Balearics. Data from this project has also been used by the Conservation, Information and Research on Cetaceans (Circe) in a broad international and interdisciplinary study of the Mediterranean fin whale (Balaenoptera physalus).

Bahamas program
This program is in association with the Dolphin Communication Project (DCP) and deals with interactions between Atlantic spotted dolphins (Stenella frontalis) and  bottlenose dolphins (Tursiops truncates). Research investigates group dynamics, population parameters and association, communication and signal exchanges between the two species.

Azores program
This project in association with the Nova Atlantis foundation deals with the ecology, distribution and reproduction of Risso's dolphins (Grampus griseus) off the coast of Pico Island in the  Azores Archipelago.

Financial support for various projects

Project on sea turtles in the Comoros Islands

SCS in association with the Ensemble Foundation support a program for protection of marine turtles, notably the  green sea turtle (Chelonia mydas) that lays its eggs on the beach of Grande Comore in the Comoro Islands after a long migration of more than  km.
These sea turtles are considered among the most endangered species on the planet according to the IUCN. In order to protect the sea turtle coming to nest on the island, three strategies have been proposed:
 An awareness campaign on issues of coastal and marine environments (including the endangered green sea turtle) is conducted for villagers, children and people of influence.
 An Information Centre for eco-tourists and villagers for which furniture, posters, flyers and appropriate educational documentation was developed. The centre collaborates with local artisans to sell items related to marine wildlife. This long-term work is expected to create an alternative economic income for the local populations and gradually deviate them from poaching.
 A coastal patrol was established. Made up of and carried out by eco-guards who have been trained in monitoring procedures of nesting sites in order to fight against poaching and to collect scientific data on the turtles' activities.

Project on Mediterranean monk seal
The Mediterranean monk seal (Monachus monachus) is critically endangered according to the IUCN Red List. In the past they were found throughout the Mediterranean Basin. Unfortunately, the monk seal suffered from pollution, depletion of its natural habitat and hunting. Today, only few hundred remain in this basin.
Since 2012, with the help of sponsorship and a fundraising campaign, SCS supports the MOm Foundation  that assumes the responsibilities of the identifying, investigating, treating and monitoring the last Mediterranean monk seals.

In Switzerland
In Switzerland, SCS aims to promote a better understanding of cetaceans and of their environment, as well as to raise public awareness of the fragility of the marine ecosystem. The educational commitment is of great importance in the local activities of the Swiss Cetacean Society. For example, SCS trains naturalist eco-guides as well as organizes lectures in cetology for adults and children and sets up various educational material and activities for kids and teenagers.
Today in Switzerland, SCS is one of the main sources of information on cetaceans and is a specialized information centre serving the public, students, travellers and the media.

Conferences and educational activities
Throughout the year, SCS organizes many conferences for school students and wider audiences, participates in radio and television programs and presents its standpoint in various museums and exhibitions.

SCS Forum
Every first Wednesday evening of even numbered months, SCS organizes a forum at the EPFL. Each forum is subject to a previously defined topic. As of present, topics such as the evolutionary process of the sperm whale, the dangers of plastic waste spread across the oceans, seal protection, the fragility of coral reefs, dolphin hunting, etc. have been addressed.

SCS lectures
SCS in association with écoOcéan organizes a training course in general cetology over 2 days. Topics such as cetacean species and their ecology, impacts of human activities on cetaceans, as well as technical scientific studies of cetaceans at sea are discussed.

Junior Sea Workshop (“Atelier Mer”)

Every year, the Swiss Cetacean Society organizes at least one "Atelier mer" or Sea Workshop. It takes place in the area of the French Riviera and the Corsica and is for troubled 12- to 16-year-olds from specialized institutions in western Switzerland. The purpose of this workshop is to sensitize the youth to the marine ecology.
It allows them to:
 Discover guided snorkeling.
 Navigate on sailboat close to the Mediterranean fauna and flora.
 Have a better understanding of the marine animals (biology, particularities, needs)
 Analyse the pollution impacts and human activities on the cetaceans and their habitat.
 Visualize the functioning of a coastal ecosystem in order to foster a respect for the marine environment
 Put into practice valid daily environmentally-friendly gestures at home and everywhere else.

References

External links
 SCS (Swiss Cetacean Society) Website

Books (in French)
 
 

Animal charities
Animal conservation organizations
Cetacean research and conservation
Charities based in Switzerland
Sustainability organizations